The 2018 Pingshan Open was a professional tennis tournament played on hard courts. It was the fifth (ATP) and fourth (ITF) editions of the tournament and part of the 2018 ATP Challenger Tour and the 2018 ITF Women's Circuit. It took place in Shenzhen, China between 12 and 18 March 2018.

Men's singles main-draw entrants

Seeds

 1 Rankings are as of 5 March 2018.

Other entrants
The following players received wildcards into the singles main draw:
  Li Zhe 
  Wu Di 
  Zhang Ze 
  Zhang Zhizhen

The following players received entry into the singles main draw as special exempts:
  Alex Bolt
  Hubert Hurkacz

The following players received entry from the qualifying draw:
  Jason Kubler
  Hiroki Moriya
  Stefano Napolitano
  Blaž Rola

Women's singles main-draw entrants

Seeds

 1 Rankings are as of 5 March 2018.

Other entrants
The following players received wildcards into the singles main draw:
  Guo Meiqi 
  Ma Shuyue 
  Xun Fangying 
  Yuan Yue

The following player received entry using a junior exempt:
  Wang Xinyu

The following players received entry by special exemptions:
  Marta Kostyuk
  Maryna Zanevska

The following players received entry from the qualifying draw:
  Gao Xinyu
  Ivana Jorović 
  Urszula Radwańska 
  Sabina Sharipova

Champions

Men's singles

 Ilya Ivashka def.  Zhang Ze, 6–4, 6–2.

Women's singles

 Viktória Kužmová def.  Anna Kalinskaya, 7–5, 6–3.

Men's doubles

 Hsieh Cheng-peng /  Rameez Junaid def.  Denys Molchanov /  Igor Zelenay, 7–6(7–3), 6–3.

Women's doubles

 Anna Kalinskaya /  Viktória Kužmová def.  Danka Kovinić /  Wang Xinyu, 6–4, 1–6, [10–7].

External links
2018 Pingshan Open at ITFtennis.com

2018
2018 ATP Challenger Tour
2018 in Chinese tennis
2018 ITF Women's Circuit
March 2018 sports events in China